Shorea biawak is a species of plant in the family Dipterocarpaceae. It is endemic to Borneo.

References

biawak
Endemic flora of Borneo
Trees of Borneo
Taxonomy articles created by Polbot